Rajmund Karwicki (15 August 1906 – 9 February 1979) was a Polish fencer. He competed at the 1936 and 1948 Summer Olympics.

References

1906 births
1979 deaths
Polish male fencers
Olympic fencers of Poland
Fencers at the 1936 Summer Olympics
Fencers at the 1948 Summer Olympics
People from Zamość County
Sportspeople from Lublin Voivodeship
People from Lublin Governorate
20th-century Polish people